Bernard Dietz (born 22 March 1948) is a German former football player and manager. He captained the West Germany national team to victory in the UEFA Euro 1980.

Club career
A defender in his professional career, Bernard Dietz played in 495 Bundesliga matches for MSV Duisburg and FC Schalke 04, scoring 70 goals in his Duisburg years and seven in his days with Schalke 04 in the top tier of German football. Leaving Duisburg for Schalke in 1982 caused him to feature 34 times (one goal) for the Gelsenkirchen outfit in the 2. Bundesliga of 1983–84 after the club had been relegated from Bundesliga in Dietz' first season with them. With the German Cup final participation in 1975 his biggest success in his club career, the defender made several other stir. He is still both the top-scoring defender in the history of the Bundesliga across all clubs and second in the list of goal-scorers for MSV Duisburg in the top flight. Although he took part in over 500 games he just received 11 bookings (and no red cards). On 5 November 1977, the down-to-earth defender scored four goals in MSV Duisburg's 6–3 against Bayern Munich and was, in 1978–79, the captain of MSV Duisburg when they reached the round of the last four in the UEFA Cup.

To honour the efforts of Dietz for MSV Duisburg in his career, the fans of the club decided to dub the club's mascot, a zebra, Ennatz. Ennatz is the nickname of Dietz.

International career
On 22 December 1974, Dietz won his debut for West Germany in a Euro 1976 qualifier against Malta in Malta. After his final game for his nation, on 19 May 1981, against Brazil in Stuttgart, he had been capped 53 times by Helmut Schön and Jupp Derwall. Participating also in the Euro 1976 and at the 1978 FIFA World Cup, Dietz was able to lift the 1980 UEFA European Football Championship trophy as the captain of the triumphant West German team.

Coaching career
Dietz stayed in the game after his retirement, working as a coach on professional and amateur level. He was head coach of ASC Schöppingen from 1 July 1987 He left the club on 30 June 1992. Then he was manager of SC Verl from 1 July 1992 to 1 Februar 1994. He then took over VfL Bochum II from 1 July 1994 to 30 June 2001. He was interim head coach of VfL Bochum from 26 October 1999 to 23 December 1999. No intention to do the job permanently, Bochum won five league matches along with a draw and a loss under Dietz' guidance. He also had a win and a loss in the German Cup. Dietz returned to coaching Bochum's youth when they found Ernst Middendorp's successor in Ralf Zumdick, but was straight back in charge of Bochum's first-team affairs after Zumdick failed to avoid the drop straight back to 2. Bundesliga in 2001. His appointment started for the 2001–02 season. His second spell on top of Bochum's coaching worked out no success and made him resign on 3 December 2001. He had a record of seven wins, six draws, and three losses in 16 matches. Switching to his old club MSV Duisburg to take charge of Duisburg's reserves in 2002, Dietz returned to 2. Bundesliga coaching later on as interim head coach. However, just as caretaker to bridge the time until Duisburg replaced Pierre Littbarski with Norbert Meier. He finished his interim reign with five wins and two losses from seven matches. On 15 May 2006, Dietz decided not to extend his deal as reserve-team coach with Duisburg and to take charge of LR Ahlen in the third division. His first match in–charge was a 3–0 win against Fortuna Düsseldorf. He resigned from his position on 29 October 2006. His final match was a 3–0 loss to Kickers Emden.

Coaching record

Honours
West Germany
UEFA European Championship: 1980

Individual
kicker Bundesliga Team of the Season: 1973–74, 1974–75, 1975–76, 1977–78, 1978–79, 1979–80, 1984–85

References

1948 births
Living people
Sportspeople from Hamm
German footballers
Association football defenders
Germany international footballers
Germany B international footballers
MSV Duisburg players
FC Schalke 04 players
German football managers
VfL Bochum managers
Bundesliga players
2. Bundesliga players
UEFA Euro 1976 players
UEFA Euro 1980 players
UEFA European Championship-winning players
UEFA European Championship-winning captains
1978 FIFA World Cup players
MSV Duisburg managers
Rot Weiss Ahlen managers
Footballers from North Rhine-Westphalia
West German footballers